Gympie is a city and a locality in the Gympie Region, Queensland, Australia. The city lies on the Mary River, which floods Gympie occasionally. The locality of Gympie is the central business district for the city of Gympie and also  the administrative centre for the Gympie Region local government area. As of June 2021, Gympie had a population of  53,851.

Gympie is famous for its gold field. It contains a number of historic buildings registered on the Queensland Heritage Register.

History

Gubbi Gubbi (Kabi Kabi, Cabbee, Carbi, Gabi Gabi) is an Australian Aboriginal language formerly spoken by the indigenous peoples of the Sunshine Coast Region and Gympie Region, particularly the towns of Caloundra, Noosa Heads, Gympie and extending north towards Maryborough and south to Caboolture.

Gympie's name derives from the Gubbi Gubbi word gimpi-gimpi, which means "stinging tree" and refers to Dendrocnide moroides. The tree has large, round leaves that have similar properties to stinging nettles. The city was previously named Nashville, after James Nash, who discovered gold in the area in 1867. The name was changed to Gympie in 1868.
Graziers were the original European settlers.  Subsequently, James Nash reported the discovery of 'payable' alluvial gold on 16 October 1867. At the time of Nash's discovery, Queensland was suffering from a severe economic depression.  Nash probably saved Queensland from bankruptcy. A memorial fountain in Gympie's Park honours Nash's discovery. The Gympie Gold Rush Festival celebrates the event today.  The Gold Rush Festival holds 10 days of cultural events in October. Gold mining still plays a role in the area's fortunes, along with agriculture (dairy predominantly), timber and tourism.  The gold rush's rapid development led to streets that are in an irregular fashion.

Nashville Masonic Lodge opened on 24 March 1869 in Duke Street. The first Master was Edward Henry King, the first goldfield commissioner in Gympie. The lodge later relocated and is now known as Pioneer Lodge, while the Duke Street site became the offices of the Shire of Woocoo.

In 1882, a handful of macadamia seeds were taken from trees in Gympie to Hawaii, where they became the basis of Hawaii's macadamia industry. In 2019, researchers collected samples from hundreds of macadamia trees in Queensland, and compared their genetic profiles to samples from Hawaiian orchards. They determined that essentially all the Hawaiian trees must have descended from a small population of Australian trees from Gympie, possibly just a single tree.  This lack of genetic diversity in the commercial crop puts it at risk of succumbing to pathogens (as has happened in the past to banana cultivars). Growers may seek to diversify the cultivated population, by hybridizing with wild specimens.

Gympie Creek Post Office opened on 1 December 1867. It was renamed Gympie in 1868.

In 1868 a slab hut was built behind the Northumberland Hotel and called the Miner's Bethel. This hut was used to hold religious services by the Anglican Church, the Roman Catholic Church and Methodist Church until each had established their own church.

A Primitive Methodist Church opened on the diggings at Gympie Creek circa July 1868. It was claimed to be the first church in Gympie. A new Primitive Methodist Church was opened on Commissioner's Hill on Sunday 30 July 1876. Commissioners Hill is described as being from the post office in Duke Street to the corner of Chandon and Henry Streets.

In August 1868, Wesleyan Methodists erected a bark hut of pole construction on Surface Hill to use as a basic chapel. It was replaced by a more permanent timber church on the same site facing Reef Street, which opened on Sunday 4 July 1869. The architect was Charles G. Smith and the builder was John Nesbit.  In 1890 a brick church was built on the site facing Channon Street and became the Surface Hill Uniting Church.

A Presbyterian Church opened on One Mile Road at One Mile on Sunday 8 November 1868.

In 1868, a Cobb & Co. service between Brisbane and Gympie commenced, running twice a week. The changing station stables were located adjacent to the Northumberland Hotel in Channon Street.

In 1869 the Church of England constructed a timber church on the corner of Palantine and School Streets; the first rector was Reverend Henry Jephson Campbell. It was known as the Church of St Peter. This church became the parish hall when a second church was built in Lady Mary Terrace in 1887. This was then superseded by the third and current church, built in brick, on the corner of Lady Mary Terrace and Amy Street.

In January 1870 tenders were called for the erection of a Roman Catholic Church.

The railway from Maryborough was completed in 1881. The North Coast railway linked Gympie to Brisbane in 1891.

St Andrew's Anglican Church was first established at Mount Pleasant / One Mile in 1876. It closed circa 1968. As at 2019, the church building no longer exists but the rectory in Graham Street had become a private home. In 2020, this was relocated to the Gympie Airfield.

Gympie Apollonian Vale Baptist Church opened on Sunday 5 November 1899. Prior to this, the Baptist congregation had met in the Oddfellows Hall and other venues.

A fire brigade was in operation in 1900.

The state declared Gympie a town in 1903.

A powdered milk factory began operations in 1953.

Flooding

Significant floods along the Mary River have caused inundations of the city in 1870, 1873, 1893, 1955, 1968, 1974, 1989, 1992, 1999, 2011, 2013, and 2022. The first recorded flood in Gympie was in 1870.  Most of the floods occur between December and April and are typically caused by heavy rainfall in the headwaters to the south.

The highest flood ever recorded in Gympie occurred on 2 February 1893 when the river peaked at 25.45 m. Gympie was declared a natural disaster area during the 1999 floods. The river peaked at 21.9 m then. On the 27 February 2022 the river peaked at 22.96 metres, superseding the 1999 flood record by over a metre.

Numerous highways and roads in and around the city which were destroyed or damaged during floods in 2011 were repaired under Operation Queenslander, the name given to post-flood reconstruction efforts in Queensland.

In March 2012, the Gympie Regional Council decided to spend about $30,000 for a cost benefit analysis on flood mitigation measures. Major flooding also occurred in 2022.

Heritage listings 

Gympie has a number of heritage-listed sites, including:
 Brisbane Road: Monkland State School Residence
 2 Caledonian Hill: Gympie Town Hall
 Channon Street: Gympie Court House
 Channon Street: Old Gympie Post Office
 Channon Street: Surface Hill Uniting Church
 26 Channon Street: Gympie Lands Office
 cnr Channon Street and Nash Streets: former Queensland National Bank
 Church Street: St Patricks Church
 17 Crown Road: former Gympie Ambulance Station
 1 Everson Road: Gympie State High School buildings
 Mary Street: Gympie and Widgee War Memorial Gates
 199 Mary Street: former Royal Bank of Queensland
 216 Mary Street: former Crawford and Co Building
 218 Mary Street: Tozer's Building
 235 Mary Street: Smithfield Chambers
 236 Mary Street: former Australian Joint Stock Bank and former Gympie Stock Exchange offices & club
 242 Mary Street: former Bank of New South Wales
 39 Nash Street: Gympie School of Arts
 River Road: Gympie Memorial Park
 1 Station Road: Railway Hotel
 Tozer Street: Gympie railway station

Population
 Aboriginal and Torres Strait Islander people made up 3.9% of the population. 
 82.4% of people were born in Australia. The next most common countries of birth were England 2.6%, New Zealand 1.9% and Philippines 0.6%.   
 89.6% of people spoke only English at home. 
 The most common responses for religion were No Religion 30.1%, Catholic 16.8% and Anglican 15.6%.

Climate
Gympie experiences a humid subtropical climate (Köppen: Cfa, Trewartha: Cfal), with hot, muggy summers and mild winters.

Attractions

The Gympie Gold Mining and Historical Museum houses memorabilia from the early gold mining era, as well as displays showcasing military, rural, transport, communications, and steam development in Australia.  The WoodWorks Museum provides an insight into the timber industry and social history of yesteryear through displays and demonstrations. Features include a large selection of pioneering hand tools, a 1925 Republic truck, bullock wagons, and a blacksmith shop.

The Valley Rattler steam train is a tourist train that began operations in 1996. It follows the Mary River through the forests and plantations of the Mary Valley to Amamoor. The train departs and returns to the Old Gympie Railway Station in Tozer Street, an original railway station from the 1900s gold rush.

Approximately 25 km south of Gympie, the town of Amamoor hosts the annual National Country Music Muster. Held over six days and nights in August in the Amamoor Forest Reserve, the Muster is the largest outdoor country music festival in Australia.

Gympie's Mary St offers a wide array of bars, cafes, and shops with 19th Century Victorian architecture. The historic Railway Hotel was built in 1915 and is listed on the Queensland Heritage Register. The Gympie Town Hall Reserve Complex, built in 1890, was added to the Queensland Heritage Register in 2011.

Mothar Mountain Speedway is Gympie's local Speedway track. With a history spanning over 50 years, its most well known feature is the unique right hand kink. The venue hosts a variety of Classes including SSA Modified Sedans, SSA Super Sedans, SSA Junior Sedans SSA Production Sedans, SSA Street Stocks, Modlites and Late Models. The Speedway has hosted the Australian Title for SSA Production Sedans in 2014, and is scheduled to host the Australian Titles for Modlites and SSA Super Sedans in April 2023. 
 
The annual Heart of Gold International Short Film Festival is held in Gympie in March.

24 km south-east of Gympie, Woondum National Park provides access to subtropical rainforest, creeks and granite outcrops. Facilities include picnic tables, barbecues, firewood, fresh water, amenities, and bush-walking tracks. Access is by dirt road and a high-clearance vehicle is recommended.

About 30 minutes' drive east of Gympie is Tin Can Bay, where one can hand-feed Indo-Pacific hump-backed dolphins. The feeding is regulated for the protection of the dolphins.

Gympie and the surrounding area is part of the Great Sandy Biosphere Reserve, listed by UNESCO as a world conservation site.

Gympie Cemetery crawls are run by the Gympie Family History Society. Participants learn about the town's pioneering families.

Education
Gympie has many schools, reflecting its importance as a regional service centre. State primary schools include:
 Gympie West State School opened on 28 January 1958.
 Chatsworth State School opened on 18 April 1900.
 Monkland State School opened on 24 September 1884.
 Jones Hill State School opened on 29 January 1902.
 Gympie Central State School opened on 18 October 1869.
 Two Mile State School opened on 9 July 1883. 
 One Mile State School was the first school opened in Gympie on 20 September 1869 as One Mile Boys State School with the One Mile Girls and Infants State School opening in October 1874. In January 1943, they were merged into One Mile State School. 
 Gympie East State School opened on 25 January 1965.
 Gympie South State School opened on 4 July 1910.

State secondary schools include:
 James Nash State High School opened on 24 January 1977.
 Gympie State High School opened on 29 January 1912. This school is one of the oldest state secondary schools in Queensland.

Private schools offer both primary and secondary education.  They include Victory College, Cooloola Christian College and St Patrick's. St Patrick's College in Gympie opened on 30 December 1916.

Gympie is home to one campus of the Wide Bay Institute of TAFE located on Cartwright Road.

The University of the Sunshine Coast (USC) has a campus in Gympie located on Cartwright Road. This campus offers undergraduate study in primary education, nursing, business, and commerce.

Amenities 
The Gympie Regional Council operates a public library at 8–14 Mellor Street. It opened in 1995.

The Gympie branch of the Queensland Country Women's Association meets at the St Johns Ambulance Rooms at 20 Apollonian Vale.

Gympie Regional Uniting Church is at 15-17 Red Hill Road. It is part of the Mary Burnett Presbytery of the Uniting Church in Australia.

Gympie Wesleyan Methodist Church is at 70 Exhibition Road, Southside. It is part of the Wesleyan Methodist Church of Australia.

There are two lawn bowls clubs in Gympie:

 Gympie Bowls Club, 16 Bowlers Drive
 The Albert Bowls Club, River Road

Transport
Road connection to Gympie is via the Bruce Highway. Rail connects via QR's North Coast railway line, which is served by daily Queensland Rail City network services to Brisbane and Traveltrain services for long distances. There are few public buses in Gympie and automobiles are the main mode of transportation.

Gympie Airport is a small local airport located to the south of the city.  It has general aviation, recreational aviation and gliding communities. The nearest domestic airport is Sunshine Coast Airport & the closest international airport is Brisbane Airport.

Governance
Eight councilors are elected to the Gympie Region local government area.

The Electoral district of Gympie in the state legislature was created in 1873 and includes Tin Can Bay, Rainbow Beach, Cooran, Pomona and parts of the Mary Valley. In 1893, Andrew Fisher was elected to the Legislative Assembly of Queensland as Labor member for Gympie and went on to become the fifth Prime Minister of Australia. Gympie's seat was eliminated in 1950 but restored in 1960. Since 1960, it has been considered a safe State Liberal-National seat having been won by the Country or National Party every election except for a brief period in the early 2000s. (It was held from 2002 to 2006 by Elisa Roberts, first as a member of the One Nation party and then as an independent, before returning to the National Party with the election of David Gibson.)

Since 2015, Tony Perrett of the Liberal National Party is the member for Gympie in the Queensland Legislative Assembly.

Traveston Crossing Dam

The project was scrapped in 2010.

The proposed dam would have flooded about 900 properties. The affected land owners and other shire residents staged rallies protesting against the proposed dam.  Strong opposition to the dam from the wider and international community based on environmental concerns related to the endangered Mary River cod, Mary River turtle, giant barred frog, Cascade tree frog and Coxen's fig parrot and the vulnerable Queensland lungfish, tusked frog, honey blue-eye fish, the Richmond birdwing butterfly and the Illidge's ant blue butterfly finally shut down the project.

Notable people

 The Amity Affliction – musicians
John Francis (Frank) Barnes – politician
John O'Connell Bligh – Native Police Commandant
Allan Boase – Australian Army Lieutenant General
 Henry Ernest Boote – writer
 Glen Boss – jockey
 Archie Bradley – boxer
 Jimmy Downey – football player
 Thomas Dunstan – politician
 Hugo William Du Rietz – gold miner, architect
 Tino Fa’asuamaleaui - NRL Rugby League Player
 Andrew Fisher – Australian Prime Minister
 Sir Thomas William Glasgow – Australian Army Major General
 Kaden Groves – professional cyclist
 Darren Hanlon – musician
 Peter Hanlon – sports writer
 Kenneth Hayne – Supreme Court Justice
 Trevor Housley – Postmaster-General
 Angus Finlay Hutton – naturalist
 Thelma Keane – businesswoman
 James Kidgell – politician
 Tracey Lewis – Paralympic swimmer
 George Mackay – politician
 Barry McTaggart – rugby player
 Mathew Mellor – politician
 James Nash – prospector
 Francis Isidore Power – politician
 Gregory Charles Rivers – actor
 Marjorie Roche – Red Cross nurse
 Christopher Scott – Paralympic cyclist
 Sir Christopher Sheehy – dairy industry administrator
 Ann Caroline Sherry AO – businesswoman 
 Jacob Stumm – newspaper owner
 Harry Sunderland – rugby administrator
 Estelle Thompson – crime novelist 
 Vivian Tozer – politician
 Harry Frederick Walker - Member of the Queensland Legislative Assembly

See also

 The Gympie Times, a current newspaper
 The Gympie Miner, a former newspaper
 Gympie Cemetery
 Djaki kundu

References

External links

 Gympie Cooloola Tourism
 Gympie Region
 
 Gympie Library

 
1867 establishments in Australia
Gympie Region
Kabi Kabi
Localities in Queensland
Populated places established in 1867
Towns in Queensland
Wide Bay–Burnett
Central business districts in Australia
Suburbs of Gympie